Gnathopalystes kochi is a spider in the family Sparassidae. This species is widespread in India, Myanmar, Malaysia, Java, Sumatra and Borneo.

References
 Simon, E. (1880a) Révision de la famille des Sparassidae (Arachnides)., Act. Soc. linn. Bord.
 N. I. Platnick   The World Spider Catalog
 Biolib

Sparassidae
Spiders of Asia
Spiders described in 1880